The 1972 Phillip Island 500K was an endurance motor race open to Group E Series Production Touring Cars. The event, which was Heat 4 of the 1972 Australian Manufacturers' Championship, was held on 21 October 1972 at the Phillip Island circuit in Victoria, Australia over a distance of 318 miles (512 km).

Class Structure
As a heat of the 1972 Australian Manufacturers' Championship, the race featured four classes defined by "Capacity Price Units".
The CP Unit value for each car was assessed by multiplying the engine capacity (in litres) by the Sydney retail price (in Australian dollars).
 Class A : Up to 3,000 CP Units
 Class B : 3,001 to 9,000 CP Units
 Class C : 9,001 to 18,000 CP Units
 Class D : Over 18,000 CP Units

Results

References

Phillip Island 500
Phillip Island 500K
Motorsport at Phillip Island
October 1972 sports events in Australia